Américo Jorge Ramón Spedaletti González (24 September 1947 – 10 June 2022) was an Argentine naturalized Chilean football player and manager who played as a forward for various clubs in both Argentina and Chile.

International career
Born in Argentina, he became a naturalized Chilean in 1974 and represented Chile national team from 1975 to 1977, making five appearances.

Personal life
After his retirement as a professional footballer, he returned to Argentina and worked as a taxi driver until the end of the 1980s.

On 6 October 2002, he suffered a serious TBI after falling from the third floor of the building where he lived due to  forgetting his keys. Unión Española and Universidad de Chile collected money for his recovery by playing a match. He left the hospital on November of the same year.

He died due to multiple health issues on 10 June 2022.

Honours
Gimnasia LP
 Torneo Promocional: 1967

Godoy Cruz
 Liga Mendocina de Fútbol: 1968

Universidad de Chile'''
 Chilean Primera División: 1969
 Torneo Metropolitano de Chile: 1969
 Copa Francisco Candelori: 1969

Unión Española
 Chilean Primera División: 1975

Everton
 Chilean Primera División: 1976

References

External links
 

1947 births
2022 deaths
Footballers from Rosario, Santa Fe
Argentine footballers
Association football forwards
Naturalized citizens of Chile
Chilean footballers
Chile international footballers
1975 Copa América players
Club de Gimnasia y Esgrima La Plata footballers
Godoy Cruz Antonio Tomba footballers
Universidad de Chile footballers
Unión Española footballers
Everton de Viña del Mar footballers
Deportes Concepción (Chile) footballers
C.D. Antofagasta footballers
Argentine Primera División players
Chilean Primera División players
Primera B de Chile players
Argentine expatriate footballers
Expatriate footballers in Chile
Argentine expatriate sportspeople in Chile
Argentine emigrants to Chile
Chilean football managers
Unión Española managers
Chilean Primera División managers